Killearn railway station served the village of Killearn, Stirling, Scotland from 1882 to 1951 on the Blane Valley Railway.

History 
The station's name changed to Killearn on 1 April 1896 when Killearn (Old) was renamed Dumgoyne Hill.

To the west was the goods yard. The station was host to a LNER camping coach from 1936 to 1939.

The station closed to passengers on 1 October 1951 and to goods traffic on 5 October 1959.

References

External links 
Killearn station on Railscot

Disused railway stations in Stirling (council area)
Railway stations in Great Britain opened in 1882
Railway stations in Great Britain closed in 1951
Former North British Railway stations
1867 establishments in Scotland
1951 disestablishments in Scotland